Please Don't Throw Me to the Christians is an unfinished and unreleased album by English singer-songwriter Eddie Stanton. It was to be released on Wild Willy Barrett's record label "Black Eye" which had, by the time the album had been fully recorded, folded. The fate of five of these songs rested in Barrett's album Organic Bondage, which he arranged to fit his style. Other tracks have been since recorded by Barrett later on in his career.

Despite not being released, two singles – containing firstly two tracks culled from the album and secondly re-recordings of two of the songs – were released on Barrett's record label.

Circa 2007, Stanton made the twenty tracks recorded for the album available on his website;

Track listing

 "Please Don't Throw Me to the Christians"
 "The Emperors Head"
 "Decline and Fall"
 "From Here to Obscurity"
 "Lucifer Wants Me for a Sunbeam"
 "Only the Good Die Young"
 "Milton Keynes (We Love You)"
 "Union Jacks in the Rain"
 "Tamac"
 "Suicide Note"
 "Africa (Oh for a Car)"
 "A Clockwork Orange"
 "East of Babel"
 "All the Angry Young Men"
 "Simply Idolatry"
 "Party Time"
 "The Hitchhiker and the Punk"
 "Tales from the Raj"
 "Gypsies Too"
 "Colour in Braille"

Personnel
 Eddie Stanton - vocals, guitar
 Wild Willy Barrett - guitar
 Hugh Jones - synthesizers
 Mark Freeman - drums
 Alan Offer - bass guitar
 Dave James
 Vietnamese Rose - backing vocals
 Paul "Whisky" Ward - synthesizers, keyboards

See also
 Damnatio ad bestias - the Roman capital punishment

References

Unreleased albums